This is a list of plant and animal species, subspecies and varieties that are endemic to Mendocino County, California, or to Mendocino and no more than one neighboring county.

Mendocino County only

Flora
Chorizanthe howellii, a flowering plant in the buckwheat family found only near Fort Bragg
Cuscuta pacifica var. papillata, a parasitic plant found only in the salt marshes of Mendocino county
Eriogonum kelloggii, a species of buckwheat found only on Red Mountain near Leggett
Harmonia guggolziorum, a flowering aster found in two locations near Hopland
Limnanthes bakeri, a meadowfarm plant known in only 20 locations near Willits
Pinus contorta var. bolanderi, the Mendocino shore pine tree, a variety of the more widespread lodgepole pine
Sedum eastwoodiae, a flower in the stonecrop family found only on Red Mountain near Ukiah

Fauna
Aplodontia rufa nigra (Point Arena mountain beaver), a mid-sized rodent regarded as a living fossil and found only near Point Arena
Opercularia ampluscolonia, a protist that inhabits ponds in Mendocino County
Plebejus idas lotis (Lotis blue butterfly), a possibly extinct gossamer-winged butterfly last recorded near Mendocino town in 1983
Speyeria zerene behrensii (Behrens' silverspot butterfly), found only near Point Arena

Mendocino County and one adjacent county
In addition, the following are endemic to an area contained in Mendocino and only one neighboring county:

Flora
Arctostaphylos mendocinoensis, a species of manzanita found only in Mendocino and Sonoma counties
Astragalus agnicidus, a species of milkvetch found only in Mendocino and Humboldt counties
Cupressus pigmaea, a species of cypress tree found only in Mendocino and Sonoma counties
Lewisia stebbinsii, a flowering purslane found only in Mendocino and Trinity counties
Veratrum fimbriatum, the fringed corn lily, a relative of the lily found only in Mendocino and Sonoma counties

Fauna
Helminthoglypta arrosa pomoensis, the Pomo Bronze Shoulderband, a  land snail found in redwood forests in Mendocino County (in the Big River, Navarro River, and Russian Gulch watersheds) and Sonoma County

See also

Natural history of Mendocino County, California

Notes

Natural history of Mendocino County, California

Mendocino County
Mendocino County